David Elginbrod is an 1863 novel by George MacDonald. It is MacDonald's first realistic novel.

Plot introduction
A novel of Scottish country life, in the dialect of Aberdeen.

A story of humble life, centering in two saintly personalities, a dignified and pious Scottish peasant, and his daughter. A vein of mysticism runs through the story, and mesmerism and electro-biology are introduced.

Literary significance and criticism
A novel which is the work of a man of genius. It will attract the highest class of readers. —Times.
There are many beautiful passages and descriptions in this book. The characters are extremely well drawn. ——Athenæum.
A clever novel. The incidents are exciting, and the interest is maintained to the close. It may be doubted if Sir Walter Scott himself ever painted a Scotch fireside with more truth. —Morning Post.
David Elginbrod is the finest character we have met in fiction for many a day. The descriptions of natural scenery are vivid, truthful, and artistic; the general reflections are those of a refined, thoughtful, and poetical philosopher, and the whole moral atmosphere of the book la lofty, pure, and invigorating. —Globe.

External links
 

1863 British novels
Novels by George MacDonald
Novels set in Aberdeenshire